Durwood or Derwood may refer to:

Bob Andrews (guitarist) (born 1959), aka Derwood, British musician
Durwood Keeton (born 1952), American football player
Durwood Merrill (1938-2003), Major League Baseball umpire
Durwood Roquemore (born 1960), former professional football player
Derwood Williams (1889–1973), American politician, Missouri senator
Gene Derwood (1909–1954), American poet and painter 
Derwood, Maryland, an unincorporated area
Durwood, Oklahoma, unincorporated community
Durwood Theatres, former name of AMC Theatres, founded by Edward Durwood
 Durwood, the name used by Endora for her son-in-law Darrin Stephens in the TV show Bewitched

See also
Durward (disambiguation)